is a turn-based role-playing video game. It is followed by Legaia 2: Duel Saga.

Gameplay
The player selects a target during battle. Each character performs on the phase based on status. The player sees corresponding vertical strikes. Each direction has abilities for skills. They perform a string of attacks with random input. The gauge increases for each turn. The number of strikes are affected by several factors. Weapons deal more damage for combos called Arts. The player can reveal it for characters. Arts Points uses Arts, draining in quantity and proportionate on length. The character performs sequences for combos. AP can be earned by dealing less damage without Arts, damaging opponents or using Spirit. Arts can be linked by each inputs. The Art ending connects with another Art, starting with down, for the player to use two Arts in a row costing fewer inputs. For spirits, each characters use defensive stances for a turn to regain AP and boost the gauge length on the next turn. Some boss battles involve enemies after the characters use spirits. Humans can absorb the power and strengthen Ra-Seru, to level up and cause effects. The Seru uses magical elements for any type of skills.

Plot
The game is set in a fantasy world, where humanity exists along strange magical creatures called Seru who aid humanity with supernatural powers. However, a mysterious Mist appears, and the Seru become rampant, opposing humanity and causing the collapse of civilization. Vahn lives in the village of Rim Elm, which is unaffected by the Mist outside and protected from Seru by a large wall. An enormous Seru, Juggernaut, destroys the wall and turns the Seru against the villagers. Vahn discovers a rare kind of Seru known as a Ra-Seru named Meta, which is both intelligent and capable of merging peacefully with a human. He awakens the power of the tree in the center of his village known as a Genesis Tree and removes the Mist and the Seru from the village. With his newfound power, he travels across the world to restore Genesis Trees and stop the Mist.

Vahn continues his journey to awaken the Genesis trees and befriends Nora, a cavegirl raised by a Ra-Seru attached to a wolf which eventually attaches itself to Nora. Vahn also meets Gala, a monk who after finding a dead genesis tree finds a Ra-Seru egg and at another genesis tree births the Ra-Seru egg that bonds with Gala. The three destroy the mist generator in their continent. The three heroes then move to another continent and reawaken the Genesis Trees on that continent, destroy its mist generator and its defender, and come across the Juggernaut birthing castle. It is revealed the mist is created with Ra-Seru which is why the Ra-Seru are immune to the mist. 

The three heroes reach the final continent and encounter several mist generators and the primary antagonist Cort, who was a prince of a kingdom on that continent and Nora is her sister. After destroying the mist generators and defeating Cort, the heroes return to Vahn's village, which is eventually attacked by Cort who has fused with Juggernaut and threatens to absorb Vahn's village and in effect kill Vahn's entire family and friends. 

The three heroes also learn that Galas arch nemesis Songi went to the land of Ra-Seru and is attempting to absorb and in effect kill the mother Genesis Tree. The three heroes arrive and defeat Gala's arch-nemesis, but are unable to save the mother Genesis Tree, and when it dies, so will all Seru. The three heroes then go to Vahn's village and defeat the fused combination of Cort and Juggernaut. After Cort's final defeat, the Ra-Seru bid farewell as they all pass away. The Seru dies leaving humans to fend for themselves from then on, and they live happily ever after.

Reception

The game received favorable reviews on GameRankings. Next Generation said, "if you can deal with the trite, hackneyed story, the new fighting engine makes this worth checking out." Famitsu scored it 27 out of 40. It sold over 300,000 units by January 2002.

Notes

References

External links
 Legend of Legaia Shrine at RPG Classics
 

1998 video games
Contrail (company) games
Fantasy video games
PlayStation (console) games
PlayStation (console)-only games
Role-playing video games
Single-player video games
Sony Interactive Entertainment games
Video games about plants
Video games developed in Japan
Video games scored by Michiru Ōshima